Lance Naik Nazir Ahmad Wani, AC, SM & Bar was an Indian soldier in the Jammu and Kashmir Light Infantry of the Indian Army. He was posthumously awarded the Ashoka Chakra, India's highest peacetime military decoration, in January 2019. He was the first recipient of the Ashok Chakra award from Kashmir region of the Indian state of Jammu and Kashmir.

In June 2019, in a tribute to Nazir, Indian Army renamed their 'Army Goodwill School (AGS) Wuzur' to 'Shaheed Lance Naik Nazir Ahmad Wani, Ashok Chakra, Sena Medal** Army Goodwill School Wuzur'.

Early life
Nazir was a resident of Cheki Ashmuji village in the Kulgam district of the Kashmir Valley of Jammu and Kashmir, India into a Kashmiri Muslim family of the Wani clan. In the early 1990s, when Wani was a young boy, he weaved Kashmiri carpets for a monthly salary of few hundred rupees. When the insurgency broke out in the 1990s, it impacted their work and finding work became a struggle.

Militancy 
According to a senior Army officer who spoke to The Times of India, "Wani was a terrorist initially and became a counter-insurgent after he realised the futility of violence". He then surrendered and became a part of the Ikhwan, a pro-government militia group led by Javed Ahmad Shah in late 1994. According to Wani's brother Mushtaq, Wani had joined Ikhwan "out of his free will, and that of God, nothing else". Three militia groups of that time had merged to form the Ikhwan to fight against the militancy. In 2002 the state government of Jammu and Kashmir under Mufti Mohammad Sayeed disbanded the Ikhwan, which led to the loss of livelihood for its members. By then Wani had a wife and two children.

Military service
Nazir joined 162 Infantry Battalion (Territorial Army), a Territorial Army battalion of the Jammu and Kashmir Light Infantry, in 2004. He was awarded Sena Medal in 2007 for gallantry and for a second time in 2018, for killing a terrorist in close combat. He took part in several major counter-insurgency operations in which top terrorists were either arrested or killed. According to one of his relatives, Wani had killed around thirty terrorists including some major terrorists.

At the time of his death, Wani's battalion, 162 Infantry Battalion TA was attached to the 34th battalion, Rashtriya Rifles while conducting counter-insurgency operations.

Operation Batagund

On 25 November 2018, a counter-terrorist operation known as Operation Batagund was launched by 34 Rashtriya Rifles at Hirpora village near Batagund, Shopian district. After intelligence relating to the presence of senior Lashkar-e-Taiba terrorists in the area was received, a cordon and search operation was initiated at midnight by a joint team of security forces consisting of the Jammu and Kashmir Police, army units and Central Reserve Police Force in the area. The terrorists then fired upon the forces after which the forces retaliated.

At 12:25 am, according to an army officer, one of the soldiers was hit. The soldier fell near the garage of a house. Under covering fire provided by his fellow soldiers hiding behind walnut trees, Wani attempted to pull the injured soldier to safety. In the meantime, the terrorists kept firing at them and changing their positions. Despite being under fire, Wani pulled out the wounded soldier.

During the gunfight, Wani entered the house and killed the district commander of Lashkar-e-Taiba and another foreign terrorist. Wani received multiple wounds on his body and head, but despite his injuries, Wani shot and injured a third terrorist. The other soldiers had entered the building by then and killed the remaining terrorists. First aid was immediately provided for his injuries and he was taken to hospital where he died due to his wounds.

According to the Jammu and Kashmir Police, the six terrorists killed in the operation belonged to Hizbul Mujahideen and Lashkar-e-Taiba and were identified as:
 Mushtaq Ahmad Mir, alias Hammad, district commander of Lashkar-e-Toiba for Shopian district
 Mohammad Abass Bhatt of Cheki Mantribugh Shopian 
 Umar Majeed Ganai, alias Maaz, alias Abu Hanzalla, of South Kulgam 
 Mohammad Waseem Wagay, alias Saifullah, of Amshipora, district commander of Hizbul Mujahideen for Shopian district
 Khalid Farooq Malik, alias Rafi, of Aliyalpora, Shopian, the district commander of Hizbul Mujahideen for Kulgam district
 One foreign terrorist from Pakistan.

The bodies of all six terrorists were retrieved. A large number of weapons and ammunition were recovered. Police stated that terrorist Abbas Bhat who was killed, was wanted in connection with the murder of Lt. Ummer Fayaz, who was abducted and murdered by terrorists in May 2017.

Funeral
On 26 November, Wani's body was taken to his family at Chak Ashmuji, wrapped in the Indian flag. During the funeral ceremony attended by 500–600 people, Wani was accorded a 21-gun salute while his body was lowered into his grave.

Ashoka Chakra
On 26 January 2019 on Republic Day, President Ram Nath Kovind posthumously awarded the Ashoka Chakra to Nazir Ahmad Wani. The award was accepted by his wife Mahajabeen at an official ceremony during the Delhi Republic Day parade. He was the first recipient of the Ashok Chakra award from the Kashmir region of the Indian state of Jammu and Kashmir.

The Ashoka Chakra citation reads as follows:

Personal life
Nazir is survived by his wife Mahajabeen who worked as a teacher and two sons, Athar and Shaid. The Hindu reported that "Wani comes from a humble background and had worked for the benefit of the underprivileged section in his village and surrounding area."

References

Further reading 

 Sonal Chaturvedi (18 February 2020)The Real Wani—Kashmir’s True Hero: A Definitive Biography of Lance Naik Nazir Ahmad Wani. Bloomsbury Publishing

External links
 Video of Lance Naik Nazir Ahmad Wani Honoured With Ashok Chakra On Republic Day

Year of birth missing
2018 deaths
Indian Muslims
Recipients of the Ashoka Chakra (military decoration)
Ashoka Chakra